C.I.D. Nazir is a 1971 Indian Malayalam -language detective film, directed and produced by P. Venu. The film stars Prem Nazir, Jayabharathi, Adoor Bhasi and Jose Prakash in the lead roles. The film was scored by M. K. Arjunan.

The film is considered to be one of the first detective movies in Malayalam. It was inspired by the 1968 Kannada film Jedara Bale which was itself based on the James Bond Franchise. The film later had a sequel titled Taxi Car (1977). The 1994 superhit CID Unnikrishnan B.A., B.Ed. was made as a homage to this film.

Premise
When CID officer Chandran, who is working on a tedious case, is murdered, officer Nazir is called in to take over his case and also nab Chandran's murderers.

Cast

Prem Nazir as CID Nazir
Jayabharathi as Shanthi
Adoor Bhasi as Bhasi
Jose Prakash
Sreelatha Namboothiri as Sreelatha
Francis
Raghavan
T. S. Muthaiah
Mancheri Chandran
 Rajan 
Bahadoor
Girish Kumar
K. P. Ummer
Nellikode Bhaskaran
Sadhana as Lovely/Radha

Soundtrack

Box office
The film was a commercial success.

Sequel

References

External links
 

1971 films
1970s Malayalam-language films
CIDNazir1
Films directed by P. Venu